Miss Julie is a 1999 film directed by Mike Figgis based on the 1888 play of the same name by August Strindberg, starring Saffron Burrows in the role of Miss Julie and Peter Mullan in the role of Jean.

Plot
Midsummer night, 1894, in northern Sweden. The complex structures of class bind a man and a woman. Miss Julie, the inexperienced but imperious daughter of the manor, deigns to dance at the servants' party. She's also drawn to Jean, a footman who has traveled, speaks well, and doesn't kowtow. He is engaged to Christine, a servant, and while she sleeps, Jean and Miss Julie talk through the night in the kitchen. For part of the night it's a power struggle, for part it's the baring of souls, and by dawn, they want to break the chains of class and leave Sweden together. When Christine wakes and goes off to church, Jean and Miss Julie have their own decisions to make.

Cast
 Saffron Burrows as Miss Julie
 Peter Mullan as Jean
 Maria Doyle Kennedy as Christine
 Tam Dean Burn as servant
 Heathcote Williams as servant
 Joanna Page as servant

References

External links
 

1999 films
Films based on works by August Strindberg
Films shot at Elstree Film Studios
British drama films
British films based on plays
American films based on plays
Films directed by Mike Figgis
1999 drama films
Metro-Goldwyn-Mayer films
United Artists films
Works based on Miss Julie
1990s English-language films
1990s British films